George Hoyle (20 April 1896 – 1977) was an English footballer who played for Rochdale.

References

Rochdale A.F.C. players
English footballers
Footballers from Rochdale
1896 births
1977 deaths
Association football forwards